Hugo Alves Velame (born 23 July 1974) is a Brazilian former professional footballer. He has played for clubs like Flamengo, Fluminense, FC Groningen, AEP Paphos, BV Veendam and Almirante Brown.

References

External links 
 VI statistics
 

Brazilian footballers
Brazil international footballers
Brazilian expatriate footballers
Brazilian expatriate sportspeople in the Netherlands
Brazilian expatriate sportspeople in Cyprus
CR Flamengo footballers
América Futebol Clube (SP) players
FC Groningen players
SC Veendam players
AEP Paphos FC players
Fluminense FC players
Almirante Brown de Arrecifes players
Eredivisie players
Eerste Divisie players
Cypriot First Division players
Expatriate footballers in the Netherlands
Expatriate footballers in Cyprus
Expatriate footballers in Argentina
Association football midfielders
People from Duque de Caxias, Rio de Janeiro
1974 births
Living people
Sportspeople from Rio de Janeiro (state)